The 2018–19 Alabama State Hornets basketball team represents Alabama State University during the 2018–19 NCAA Division I men's basketball season. The Hornets, led by 14th-year head coach Lewis Jackson, play their home games at the Dunn–Oliver Acadome in Montgomery, Alabama as members of the Southwestern Athletic Conference.

Previous season
The Hornets finished the 2017–18 season 8–23, 8–10 in SWAC play to finish in seventh place. Due to Grambling State's ineligibility, they received the No. 6 seed in the SWAC tournament where they lost to Texas Southern in the quarterfinals.

Roster

Schedule and results

|-
!colspan=9 style=| Non-conference regular season

|-
!colspan=9 style=| SWAC regular season

|-
!colspan=9 style=| SWAC tournament

References

Alabama State
Alabama State Hornets basketball seasons
Alabama State Hornets basketball
Alabama State Hornets basketball